Desmond Barrit is a Welsh actor, best known for his stage work.

Biography
An early screen role for Barrit came in Alice through the Looking Glass (1998), in which he played Humpty Dumpty.

In 2003, he played Shylock in the Chichester Festival Theatre's production of Shakespeare's The Merchant of Venice, while in 2007 he appeared in The History Boys at Wyndham's Theatre portraying the general studies teacher, Hector, made famous by Richard Griffiths in the film version.

In 2004, in a limited-run revival of A Funny Thing Happened on the Way to the Forum at the Royal National Theatre  Barrit played Pseudolus opposite Philip Quast as Miles Gloriosus, Hamish McColl as Hysterium and Isla Blair as Domina (who had previously played Philia in the 1963 production). The production was nominated for the 2005 Olivier Award, Outstanding Musical Production.

On 7 July 2008, he took over the role of The Wizard from Nigel Planer in the West End production of Wicked at the Apollo Victoria Theatre. Originally set to begin 9 June, his performance had to be postponed as he had to undergo an operation.

Beginning 12 December 2011, he returned to Wicked, reprising his role of the Wizard, taking over from Clive Carter. He ended his third return engagement with the show on 7 July 2012 (four years after his debut), and was replaced three weeks later by Keith Bartlett.

In 2014, he appeared as Michaud in Helen Edmundson's adaptation of Therese Raquin at the Theatre Royal, Bath.

References

Living people
1944 births
Welsh male stage actors
Welsh male musical theatre actors
Male actors from Swansea
Laurence Olivier Award winners
20th-century Welsh male actors
21st-century Welsh male actors